Line 1 is the main west–east line of Suzhou Rail Transit, and it started service on April 28, 2012. Line 1 is the first rapid transit line in Suzhou and this line is operated by Suzhou Rail Transit Co., Ltd.

Construction
Construction on Line 1 began on December 26, 2007, and was scheduled to be completed by 2012. It is a line running generally east–west, from Mudu in western Suzhou to Zhongnan Street in Suzhou Industrial Park. It will be 25 km long with 24 stations.
On December 30, 2011, the first 21 cars for Line 1 have been delivered.

Opening timeline

Stations

Operations

Intervals

First Trains & Last Trains

Fares
Fares start at 2.00 Yuan (￥) and can take 6 kilometers (km), 6 km to 16 km every additional 1.00 Yuan (￥) can take 5 km, 16 km to 30 km every additional 1 Yuan (￥) can take 7 km, 30 km and above every additional 1 Yuan (￥) can take 9 km, so the whole journey of Line 1 is 6 Yuan (￥).

From a select start station to a select destination station, please see the following fare table.

References

Suzhou Industrial Park
Suzhou Rail Transit lines
Railway lines opened in 2012